New Lisbon is an unincorporated community in Dudley Township, Henry County, Indiana.

History
New Lisbon was originally called Jamestown, and under the latter name was platted in 1833. Jamestown was named in honor of one of its founders, but it was afterwards changed because there was another post office in the state with a similar name. It was then named after New Lisbon, Columbiana County, Ohio. The New Lisbon post office was established in 1836.

Geography

References

Unincorporated communities in Henry County, Indiana
Unincorporated communities in Indiana